The Queens International Film Festival, in Queens, New York, USA, ran from 2003-2009. It is currently defunct with the website shut down. From the festival's embers the Queens World Film Festival emerged.

References

External links
Queens International Film Festival
Queens World Film Festival

Defunct film festivals in the United States
Film festivals in New York City
Culture of Queens, New York
Film festivals established in 2003